Kut-e Said (also Romanized as Kūt-e Sa‘īd; also known as Kūt-e Seyyed) is a village in Jazireh-ye Minu Rural District, Minu District, Khorramshahr County, Khuzestan Province, Iran. At the 2006 census, its population was 441, in 84 families.

References 

Populated places in Khorramshahr County